It Takes Two was an Australian music talent show, which ran for three seasons from May 2006 to April 2008. It was based on the original UK programme Just the Two of Us.

Concept
The show paired celebrities with professional singers who each week competed against each other in a sing-off to impress a panel of judges and ultimately the viewing public in order to survive potential elimination.

Through both telephone and SMS voting, viewers voted for the duo they thought should remain in the competition. Judges' scores were also taken into account and were combined with the viewer votes when determining which duos stayed and went each week. In all cases, the home viewers always had the final say.

The show was originally referred to in the media as Singing with the Stars, partly because of the similarity in concept to Dancing with the Stars.

Grant Denyer hosted It Takes Two between 2006 and 2008 with a various of female co-hosts such as Terasa Livingstone, Kate Ritchie and the most recent host from the 2008 season Erika Heynatz.

Every season finale ended with all contestants, judges and hosts singing the show's theme song "It Takes Two", originally performed by Marvin Gaye and Kim Weston, and the studio audience and home viewers were encouraged to join in the singing too. By the end of 2008, Seven Network announced that they had no plans for a fourth season.

On air
Regular judges
Marina Prior 
James Valentine
Ross Wilson
Amanda Pelman

Music director
Chong Lim

Guest judge
Daryl Braithwaite (Guest judge in season 2)
Dannii Minogue (Guest judge in season 3)

Co-hosts
Erika Heynatz (2008)
Kate Ritchie (2007)
Terasa Livingstone (2006)

Season One (2006)
The first season premiered on Sunday 28 May 2006 and concluded on Sunday 6 August 2006. It featured the following celebrities:

Judges' scores
Scorecard
 indicate the couples with the lowest score for each week.
 indicate the couples with the highest score for each week.
 indicates the couples eliminated that week
 indicates the winning couple.
 indicates the runner-up couple

EP = Episode
S = Swing, P = Pop, R = Rock, M = Movies/Musicals, R&R = Rock & Roll, N1 = Number Ones, B = Ballad, D = Disco, C = Country, PR = Professional Hit, R&B = R&B, FA = Fast, SL = Slow, J = Journey.

Erika Heynatz and her partner David Hobson were eventually declared the winners, defeating Sarah Ryan and her partner, Guy Sebastian.

Average chart
This chart is based on the celebrities averages and not their place in the competition.

Season summary 

There was no episode broadcast on 11 June due to the Seven Network's coverage of a rugby union international between Australia and England, therefore there were no contestant eliminations for that week.
On 23 July, Larry Emdur was the fill-in host for Grant Denyer. This was due to Denyer's commitments in the second tier of the V8 Supercars series.
Nick Lachey was a special guest in the grand finale on 6 August, who performed "What's Left of Me".

Season Two (2007)
The second season premiered on Tuesday, 8 May 2007 and concluded on Tuesday, 10 July 2007. It featured the following celebrities:

Judges' scores 

1Week 6 featured a guest judge (Daryl Braithwaite), and scores were out of 50.
2Contestants in weeks 8 & 9 performed two songs, resulting with two scores out of 40, and added to out of 80.
3Contestants in the grand finale performed three songs, with three scores out of 40, and added out of 120.

Average chart
This chart is based on the celebrities averages and not their place in the competition.

Season summary 
It was reported that celebrities Laura Csortan and Candice Falzon also auditioned, but were turned down for a "lack of basic singing ability".
Kate Ritchie, a contestant in season one, also replaced Terasa Livingstone as co-host for this season.
New singing partners included Anthony Callea, David Campbell and Kate Ceberano, replacing Guy Sebastian, Glenn Shorrock and Karen Knowles.
On 15 May, Larry Emdur was the fill-in host for Grant Denyer. In this episode, Kate Ritchie made a comment that when he was the host last time, she got voted out from last season.
On 12 June, the show featured a guest judge, Daryl Braithwaite.
On 26 June, the show featured a special guest, Canadian singer Michael Bublé who sang a few songs from his new album, Call Me Irresponsible.

Season Three (2008)
The third and final season of It Takes Two commenced on Tuesday, 12 February 2008 and concluded on Tuesday, 22 April 2008. Erika Heynatz, winner of the show's first season was the new co-host alongside Grant Denyer. Here's all the celebrities featured in the final season:

Judges' scores 

1Week 5 featured a guest judge (Dannii Minogue), and scores were still out of 40. She replaced Ross Wilson for the week, as he was unable to attend.
2Contestants in weeks 8 & 9 performed two songs, resulting with two scores out of 40, and added to out of 80.
3Contestants in the grand finale will perform three songs, with three scores out of 40, and added out of 120.

Average chart
This chart is based on the celebrities averages and not their place in the competition.

Season summary 

Despite being turned down for a lack of basic singing ability in Season 2, ironwoman Candice Falzon is one of the contestants in Season 3.
New singing partners in this season are Ricki-Lee Coulter, Ian Moss and Adam Harvey, replacing Paulini Curuenavuli, Dave Gleeson and Troy Cassar-Daley.
Kate Ritchie declined to return for the third season of the show.
Scott Draper, Mark Wilson, Julia Morris, John Mangos, and Russell Robertson appeared on the Deal or No Deal – It Takes Two special, which also aired on the Seven Network during the week of 3 February 2008.
On 18 March 2008, a countdown special of It Takes Two aired for one hour highlighting each singing duos journey the final six have had throughout their stint in Season 3. Hence, no live performances were aired, therefore no contestant was eliminated that week.
Dannii Minogue performed her version of disco track  Xanadu (Olivia Newton-John and Electric Light Orchestra song) on an episode of this season.

Ratings 
Season 1 was a hit for the Seven Network, providing them with solid numbers post , where on a Sunday; Seven had little success up against the Nine Network's 60 Minutes, and Big Brother and Australian Idol on Network Ten.

Season 2 moved to a new night and time in 2007: 7:30 pm Tuesdays, airing in the slot usually occupied by the highly successful Dancing with the Stars. The premiere ranked third for the night, averaging 1.5 million viewers, behind Seven's news programming and ahead of a special extended edition of Nine's 20 to 1 episode "Great Movie One-Liners". The show managed to stay in the top 3 of the rating, and proved to be very successful for the Seven Network.

In Season 3, with only one season of Dancing with the Stars to air later in 2008, It Takes Two was moved to February, however retained the highly successful timeslot of 7:30 pm on Tuesdays.

References

External links
 Official website (via Internet Archive)

Seven Network original programming
2000s Australian reality television series
Australian music television series
Singing talent shows
2006 Australian television series debuts
2008 Australian television series endings